Yangli Station is a metro station of Line 2 of the Fuzhou Metro. It is the current eastern terminus on the line and located near Liuyi Garden and Yangli Xinyuan, Jin'an District, Fuzhou, Fujian, China. It started operation on April 26, 2019.

Station layout

Exits

References 

Railway stations in China opened in 2019
Fuzhou Metro stations